Charles Tyrrrell was the Dean of Nelson from 1993 until 2009.

References

Deans of Nelson
Living people
Year of birth missing (living people)
Place of birth missing (living people)